Giovanni Fabbian (born 14 January 2003) is an Italian professional footballer, who plays for  club Reggina, on loan from Serie A club Inter Milan.

Club career
On 30 July 2022, Fabbian joined Reggina in Serie B on loan. He made his Serie B debut for Reggina on 14 August 2022 in a game against SPAL. He scored his first goal in his third game on 28 August 2022 against Südtirol.

International career
Fabbian was first called up to represent his country in November 2018 for the Under-16 squad friendlies. He represented Italy at the 2022 UEFA European Under-19 Championship, where Italy reached the semi-final.

References

External links
 

2003 births
People from Camposampiero
Sportspeople from the Province of Padua
Footballers from Veneto
Living people
Italian footballers
Italy youth international footballers
Association football midfielders
Inter Milan players
Reggina 1914 players
Serie B players